Peshawar Ring Road (also known officially as Khyber Pakhtunkhwa Highway 13) is a  orbital highway located in Peshawar, Khyber Pakhtunkhwa province, Pakistan.

Route
The ring road serves as a bypass for heavy transport vehicles and facilitates Afghanistan-bound traffic. It also serves as the terminus for the Peshawar-Charsadda Road, Peshawar-Bara Road, Peshawar-Dalazak Road and Jamrud-Warsak Road.

Reconstruction
At a ceremony in Peshawar on 27 April 2010, United States Ambassador to Pakistan Anne W. Patterson joined President Asif Ali Zardari, Khyber Pakhtunkhwa Governor Owais Ahmed Ghani, and Khyber Pakhtunkhwa Chief Minister Amir Haider Khan Hoti in inaugurating the  Peshawar Southern Bypass (Southern Ring Road). The U.S.-financed project provided  in upgrades to the road. The US Ambassador stated the road would provide ease traffic between Charsadda and Hayatabad, improve security, and generate greater trade opportunities for the citizens of Khyber Pakhtunkhwa and the Federally Administered Tribal Areas,".

Expansion
The Peshawar Ring Road's northern half is currently Under construction since 2017. From Warsak Road, the ring road will be expanded towards Hayatabad, passing through Palosi and Regi villages.

See also
Provincial Highways of Khyber Pakhtunkhwa

Notes 

Highways in Khyber Pakhtunkhwa
Roads in Khyber Pakhtunkhwa
Ring roads in Pakistan